Otto Feyder (December 13, 1877 – February 10, 1961) was an American gymnast who competed in four events at the 1904 Summer Olympics.

References

External links
 

1877 births
1961 deaths
American male artistic gymnasts
Olympic gymnasts of the United States
Gymnasts at the 1904 Summer Olympics
Sportspeople from Chicago
20th-century American people